Charley Creek may refer to:

Charley Creek (Asotin Creek), a stream in Washington
Charley Creek (Clallam River), a stream in Washington

See also
Charlie Creek (disambiguation)